Proposition 71 may refer to:

 2004 California Proposition 71, a California voter initiative to support stem cell research

 2014 Washington, D.C. Initiative 71, a Washington, D.C. voter initiative to legalize recreational marijuana